North Point Marina State Recreation Area is an Illinois state park on  in Lake County, Illinois, United States. It has 1,500 slips for the mooring of boats.

References

State parks of Illinois
Protected areas of Lake County, Illinois